Paddy Reilly is a former Gaelic footballer who played for the Dublin county team. Reilly was awarded an All Star for his performances with Dublin in 1974. He won an All-Ireland medal with Dublin during his All Star year. His next and final All-Ireland medal came in 1977, where he appeared as a substitute.

Year of birth missing (living people)
Living people
Dublin inter-county Gaelic footballers
Gaelic football backs
Winners of two All-Ireland medals (Gaelic football)